The Vorkuta is a river in Komi Republic, Russia. It is a right tributary of the Usa. The city Vorkuta lies on its banks.

References 

Rivers of the Komi Republic